Sa Sung-Keun (Korean:사성근, born 27 January 1967) is a South Korean sledge hockey player. He played in the 2010 and 2014 Paralympic Winter Games. He won a silver medal at the 2012 IPC Ice Sledge Hockey World Championships.

References

External links 
 

1967 births
Living people
South Korean sledge hockey players
Paralympic sledge hockey players of South Korea